Violet Obiamaka Odogwu-Nwajei (born May 15, 1942) is a former Nigerian track and field athlete. She is a former president of the Athletic Federation of Nigeria and a vice-president of the Confederation of African Athletics.

Life

Odogwu was born in Asaba, Delta State.  She started education in the city before moving to Lagos where she completed her secondary education.

In the 1950s, Violet and her sister Juliet ran for the Ladies Sports Club. In 1958, she represented Nigeria at the 1958 Commonwealth Games. Her progressive performance at the event earned her a 'Sports Woman of the Year' award. After the games, she continued with her studies taking courses on secretarial studies. In 1963, she went back to athletics and represented Nigeria at the first All-African Games in the 80m hurdle.

Odogwu was a member of the Nigerian contingent to the 1966 Commonwealth Games, Kingston. At the Kingston games, she earned a bronze medal jumping 20 feet,  inches in the long jump event to become the first female African medalist at the Commonwealth Games.

In 1968, she captained the Nigerian women athletics team to the 1968 Olympics. She did not win a medal but was a finalist in long jump   She was a bronze medalist at the Little Olympics, held a year earlier in preparation for the main event.

Notes

Sources

Nigerian female long jumpers
Nigerian female high jumpers
Nigerian female hurdlers
Athletes (track and field) at the 1968 Summer Olympics
Olympic athletes of Nigeria
Athletes (track and field) at the 1958 British Empire and Commonwealth Games
Athletes (track and field) at the 1966 British Empire and Commonwealth Games
Commonwealth Games bronze medallists for Nigeria
Commonwealth Games medallists in athletics
1942 births
Living people
20th-century Nigerian women
Medallists at the 1966 British Empire and Commonwealth Games